Rajah Broadcasting Network, Inc. (which stands for RAmon JAcinto Holdings) is a Philippine television and radio network owned by guitarist-singer-businessman Ramon "RJ" Jacinto. The network's studio headquarters located at Ventures I Bldg., Makati Avenue cor. Gen. Luna Street, Makati.

About
The RJ Group was founded by Ramon “RJ” Jacinto 50 years ago in the Philippines. Ramon Jacinto was born on June 3, 1945, in Pasay, Philippines. His grandfather, Dr. Nicanor Jacinto, founded the Philippine Bank of Commerce, which was the first Filipino-owned private bank, and RJ's father, Don Fernando P. Jacinto founded the steel industry in the country—Jacinto Steel and Iligan Integrated Steel Mills, which are now known as National Steel.
 
At the age of 15, RJ Enterprises pioneered in multi-track recording in the Philippines, utilizing the first three multi-track Ampex in Southeast Asia.
 
After the EDSA People Power Revolution on February 25, 1986, RJ came home from exile on March 5, 1986, and the new democratic regime returned the family properties and his radio stations. Those assets were seized and operated by the military for 14.5 years.
 
RJ's radio station, DZRJ, became the voice of the democratic revolution, known as Radyo Bandido, and was the recipient of freedom awards after that.
 
RJ immediately expanded his radio stations and started many businesses after that, making up for lost time.
 
Today, the RJ Group is composed of broadcasting, entertainment, and music store enterprises.
 
This includes a nationwide network of 11 total FM and AM radio stations and a TV station, RJ DigiTV, which is carried nationwide by the cable networks, and in Metro Manila via Digital Terrestrial Television. The RJ broadcasting group is known to be the prime movers of locally produced music, discovering many talents from the 60s on, who have become name-brand entertainers in the Philippine music scene.
 
RJ FM 100.3, the flagship radio station of the group, plays the greatest and the latest hits from five decades, packaging it as three songs in a row. Following the same format, it is the most successful radio station whose musical playlist is defined not by genre, but by sound. Its programming format has been popularly lauded as a groundbreaking formula and is streamed 24 hours a day via Facebook, on the web and through the radio. Its primary markets are the movers and shakers, decision makers, and upwardly mobile youth. RJ FM DJs, namely Steve O’Neal and Renen de Guia, owner of Ovation Productions, have become major producers and promoters of the biggest and hottest concerts in the Philippines.

Franchise renewal
On October 9, 2018, in accordance with current constitutional rules, it was granted a 25-year legislative franchise under Republic Act (R.A.) 8104 was approved by the House of Representatives and by the Senate of the Philippines. On August 31, 2019, which renewed Rajah Broadcasting Network, Inc.'s franchise to construct, install, operate and maintain commercial radio and TV broadcasting stations signed by Philippine President Rodrigo Duterte under Republic Act No. 11414.

RBN stations nationwide

RJTV owned and operated stations
List of RJTV TV Stations.

Digital

Analog

RJTV via cable and satellite television

Radio stations
List of radio stations.

RJAM stations

RJFM stations

Inactive stations

Broadcast assets

RJTV
RJTV, known on-air as RJ DigiTV, is a minor Philippine flagship television network. Founded in May 1993. Its headquarters can be found at the Ventures I Bldg. in Makati.

DZRJ-AM
DZRJ-AM, also known as DZRJ 810 AM Radyo Bandido, is the AM radio station of Rajah Broadcasting Network in Metro Manila. Radio studios are located at Ventures I Bldg., Makati Ave. cor. Gen. Luna St., Makati; and the transmitter is situated at Km. 21, Quirino Highway, Brgy. Pasong Putik, Novaliches, Quezon City.

DZRJ-FM
DZRJ-FM, also known as RJ FM 100.3, is a music FM radio stations of the Rajah Broadcasting Network. The stations' The Greatest and The Latest hits format. Radio studios are located at Ventures I Bldg., Makati Ave. cor. Gen. Luna St., Makati; and the transmitter is situated at Brgy. San Roque, Antipolo City, Rizal.

Cable/Terrestrial assets

Radyo Bandido TV

Radyo Bandido TV is a Tagalog-language news/talk channel of Rajah Broadcasting Network. The channel predominantly airs simulcasts of DZRJ 810 AM programs. This channel was launched last September 16, 2019. Radyo Bandido TV started its official broadcasting on October 15, 2019.

RJ Rock TV

RJ Rock TV is a music and entertainment cable/terrestrial television channel operated by Rajah Broadcasting Network. It was launched on September 1, 2019.

Other assets

Divisions
 RJ Group of Companies

Films and studios
 RJ Academy of Music
 RJ Productions
 RJ Recording Studios
 RJ Guitar Center
 RJ Bistro
 RJ Shop
 RJ Electronics

Other properties
 Jacinto Color Steel Inc.

Productions and affiliates
 The Philippine Star
 VOA
 BBC
 Jesus is Our Shield Worldwide Ministries (Oras ng Himala)
 TV Maria

Defunct
 2nd Avenue
 8TriMedia Broadcasting Network

References

External links

Radio stations in the Philippines
Philippine radio networks
Television networks in the Philippines
Television channels and stations established in 1993
English-language television stations in the Philippines
Mass media companies established in 1963
Philippine companies established in 1963
Companies based in Makati